Gosha is a rural locality (a selo) in Yugskoye Rural Settlement, Cherepovetsky District, Vologda Oblast, Russia. The population was 50 as of 2002. There are 8 streets.

Geography 
Ochenikovo is the nearest rural locality.

References 

Rural localities in Cherepovetsky District